The Camp Lejeune incident refers to the outbreak of hostilities between black and white enlisted Marines at an NCO Club near the United States Marine Corps's Camp Lejeune in North Carolina, on the evening of July 20, 1969. It left a total of 15 Marines injured, and one, Corporal Edward E. Blankston, dead. It was subsequently investigated by the military and led to widespread changes in military race relations and policy.

Circumstances
After the 1968 assassination of Martin Luther King Jr., who had opposed the Vietnam War and the use of Black people in the conflict, a series of race riots swept dozens of American cities and racial tensions were heightened throughout American society.

In 1969, the U.S. troop presence in Vietnam reached its peak of 549,000, and Black people often made up a disproportionate 25% or more of combat units in Vietnam, while constituting only 12% of the military. 20% of black males were combat soldiers, sailors, airmen and marines, while the percentage of Whites in combat roles was lower. 
 
Camp Lejeune's racial make up in 1969 was 14% black, though the number in certain combat infantry battalions was over 25%. Most of the Black Marines came from poor, rural communities from Louisiana, Mississippi, Alabama, Georgia, and South Carolina. Most of the white Marines were recruited from similarly underprivileged and rural communities from Tennessee, Kentucky, Oklahoma, Missouri, West Virginia, Indiana, Illinois, and Texas.

Sequence of events

Aftermath and official report

An investigation conducted by Col. Louis S. Holler for the military after the incident indicated that the source of the incident stemmed from "a general lack of compliance on the part of officers and noncommissioned officers with the existing policies, either by intent, in spirit, or through ignorance", that "many white officers and noncommissioned officers retain prejudices and deliberately practice them" and that "the Marine Corps, are returning Marines, both black and white, to civilian society with more deeply seated prejudices than were individually possessed upon entrance to service." In response to this and other racial incidents, the military made "a "concerted effort to encourage opportunities for cultural diversity and racial pride amongst minority groups.

References
Notes

Bibliography
 

African-American history of the United States military
History of racial segregation in the United States
African American
July 1969 events in the United States
1969 in North Carolina